Rio Espera is a municipality in Minas Gerais, Brazil.

As of 2020, the town has 5,402 inhabitants and is 160 km to the southeast of Belo Horizonte. The town was founded in 1710 when a group of Portuguese explorers, coming from São Paulo, stopped beside a brook to wait for their companions. The site was originally known as Arraial de Espera.

References

Populated places established in 1710
Municipalities in Minas Gerais
1710 establishments in the Portuguese Empire